Elasticity of complementarity (Hamermesh, 1993) is the percentage responsiveness of relative factor prices to a 1 percent change in relative inputs.

Mathematical definition

Given the production function  then the elasticity of complementarity is defined as

The inverse of elasticity of complementarity is elasticity of substitution.

References
Hamermesh, Daniel S., Labor Demand, Princeton University Press, Princeton NJ, 1993, 

Elasticity (economics)